Spilomela discordens is a moth in the family Crambidae. It is found in Panama, Costa Rica and Honduras.

The wingspan is about 21 mm. Adults are white, marked with brown.

References

Moths described in 1914
Spilomelinae